San Banarje is an American independent filmmaker, entrepreneur, producer, screenwriter, editor, photographer and actor. He was born in Kolkata, India to an orthodox Hindu Brahmin family but as he grew older, he stopped practicing religion. A resident of Houston, Texas, San makes Christian films with co-producer Brian Stewart.

Personal life 
San Banarje had a very humble beginning. He was born in Calcutta, India in a place called Lake Camp. Banarje lived only a couple of blocks from the house of Academy Award winning director Satyajit Ray who inspired him immensely along with Brian De Palma, Woody Allen, Krzysztof Kieślowski, Martin Scorsese, Vittorio De Sica, Michael Mann, Clint Eastwood, Jean-Luc Godard, Stanley Kubrick, Rainer Fassbinder and many other.

San's mother was a nurse at the SSKM Hospital in the mid seventies. Later she worked for the Health Department. Apart from having a nursing degree, she also has Masters in Arts and a doctorate in Pharmacy. San's dad worked in the Eastern Railways later he studied Law and became an attorney, he also studied medicine and pharmacy.

After moving to Houston, San started his production company Lake Camp Productions, named after the refugee camp where San grew up. In 2003 he founded an actor's studio called Next Actor Studio with Trisha Ray. In 2012, San and Trisha also founded the non-profit called The Next Samaritan Project which shares information to stay cancer-free and inspirational survivor news. The foundation's motto is not to accept any donation in a bid to pay it forward. In 2015 San founded Niffhouston International Film Festival to power the Houston film scene. In 2017 after seeing the catastrophe faced by animals during Hurricane Harvey San formed 'SAVE SOME SOULS' a non-profit Dog rescue to save dogs from kill shelters and streets and find them home.

When San is not working in films, he teaches cinematography, filmmaking, editing and film study at Next Actor Studio.
San is also a still photographer.

Films 
In 2004, San started full time work behind the camera while also acting. In 2005, San worked alongside one of his favorite actors Lou Diamond Phillips in Sony Pictures' Striking Range.

In 2007, San shot the film Money in Houston, Paris, Cannes and Kolkata in a dogma style. The short version of the film was screened at the Cannes Film Festival's Short Film Corner in 2007 and turned into a feature that was shot in France, USA and India.

In early 2009, San went to Calcutta to shoot the feature 'Sugarbaby' with thespian Soumitra Chatterjee. The film was directed by Trisha Ray and produced by Boat Angel Family Films.

In winter 2009, he shot the thriller Bodhisattva, once again starring Soumitra Chatterjee in Calcutta which he co-wrote with Trisha Ray, directed, shot, produced and acted in. The film won the Platinum Remi award at the Houston Worldfest International Film Festival, Best of the Fest at Gulf Coast Film Festival, Best Foreign Film at Alexandria Film Festival, Best Film at Bare Bones Film Festival where San received an Indie Auteur award.

In summer 2011, San co-produced the film "Inside Out" with producing partner and writer Brian Stewart. 
A month later, he wrote and directed the film The Nowhere Son starring Soumitra Chatterjee, and himself in the lead. Eminent movie critic Joe Leydon named the film in his list of 'Five Not to Miss Movies at Worldfest 2013'. The film also garnered rave reviews when screened at Hoboken International Film Festival.

In 2012, San wrote and directed the short 'Semper Fi' based on true events of an unarmed young marine reservist who was shot and killed by his girlfriend's father who was set free due to Texas law of self-defense.

In Summer 2013, San directed, shot and produced a thriller "The Shadow Behind You", which he co-wrote with Trisha Ray. This was followed by his 2013 Fall film 'Artisse' written by Brian Stewart, that he shot and co-produced. In winter 2013, San shot and co-produced the film 'Sex, Marriage and Infidelity in New York' for debuting director-writer Richard Finger, a columnist for Forbes with actors Charlie O'Connell, Shannon Tweed, wife of KISS founder and bassist Gene Simmons and their daughter Sophie Simmons.

In 2015, San directed and produced the comedy 'A Curry on an American Plate' with actors Rick Fox, Andrea Guasch and Charlie O'Connell on a screenplay that he co-wrote with Trisha Ray, based on a story that he had written back in 2007.

In 2015, San was cast in the film 'Orphan Train' as the main villain Yatze opposite Indian actress Mahie Gill and Spanish actress Andrea Guasch. The film later turned into a series and wrapped the first season in 2017.

Voluntary Works 
In 2005, Banarje along with some of his friends volunteered in a homeless shelter in Houston to help several victims of Hurricane Katrina, which he considers as his biggest life lesson.

San Banarje and Trisha Ray run a non- profit organization called Next Samaritan Project (nextsamaritan.org) whose mission is to help cancer fighters get rides, meals, supports etc. during their treatment, make PSA on cancer to educate and spread awareness. The organization is also involved in animal rescue, and work towards saving dogs from euthanasia at the shelters, take them to vet, save dogs dumped on streets and vet them, and get them placed in homes.

Awards

Filmography 
 Flipped (2000) Feature (actor, producer, executive producer) 
 The Mission (2004)  Short (director, cinematographer, actor, writer, producer)
 Closure (2005)  Short (producer)
 The Enemy Inside (2005)  Short (director, writer, producer)
 Striking Range (2006)  Feature (actor)
 Bleep Love (2006) Feature (actor, producer, executive producer)
 Money (2007) Feature (director, cinematographer, producer, executive producer)
 Federal Case (2007) Feature  (cinematographer, producer)
 Stanislavski in September (2008) short (cinematographer, producer)
 Train (2008) short  (writer, director, cinematographer, producer)
 Sugarbaby (2009) Feature (actor, cinematographer, producer)
 Terracotta (2009) short(director, actor)
 Bodhisattva (2009) feature (writer, director, actor, cinematographer, producer, executive producer)
 Cleaning Up (2010) short (writer, director,  cinematographer, producer )
 Inside Out (2011) Feature  (actor, producer)
 The Nowhere Son (2011)  Feature ( writer, director, cinematographer, producer, actor)
 Marcha Atras (2011) short (executive producer)
 Semper Fi (2012) short ( writer, director, cinematographer, producer)
 Detect Early Save Life (2012) PSA (writer, director, producer)
 Physiotherapy (2013) short (actor)
 Artisse (2013) feature (cinematographer, producer)
 Sex, Marriage and Infidelity (2014) feature (cinematographer, producer)
 The Shadow Behind You (2015) feature - Maggie (writer, director, cinematographer, actor, producer, executive producer)
 A Curry on an American Plate (2017) feature (writer, director, cinematographer, producer, executive producer)
 Orphan Train (2017) feature (actor, producer)

References

External links

American directors
People from Kolkata
Indian emigrants to the United States
Living people
Year of birth missing (living people)
American people of Indian descent